The 2013 Indonesian Community Shield was the third Indonesian Community Shield. The match was contested by the 2011–12 Indonesian Premier League winners Semen Padang FC and 2012 Piala Indonesia winners Persibo Bojonegoro. It took place on 10 February 2013 at the Haji Agus Salim Stadium in Padang, Indonesia. Semen Padang won the match 4–1.

Match details

References

Indonesian Community Shield
Indonesian Community Shield
2013 in Indonesian football